Paula Arcos Poveda (born 21 December 2001) is a Spanish handball player who plays as a right back for CB Atlético Guardés and for Spain internationally. She made her Olympic debut representing Spain at the 2020 Summer Olympics.

She was included in the Spanish squad in the women's handball competition for the 2020 Summer Olympics.

Notes

References

External links
 
 
 

2001 births
Living people
Spanish female handball players
Handball players at the 2020 Summer Olympics
Olympic handball players of Spain
21st-century Spanish women